Portrait of Paulette Jourdain is a 1919 oil painting by Italian painter Amedeo Modigliani. It was in the personal collection of A. Alfred Taubman. The painting was sold at auction by Sotheby's in November 2015 for $42.8 million. The painting depicts Pauline Jourdain, who moved from Concarneau in Brittany to Paris in 1919 as a teenager.
One of Modigliani's largest works, it shows Cubist influences and references the Mona Lisa.

References

External links
 Le modèle et ses peintres: 1991 interview with Paulette Jourdain on Institut national de l'audiovisuel website

1919 paintings
Paintings by Amedeo Modigliani